Queen Inmok (인목왕후, 仁穆王后; 15 December 1584 – 13 August 1632), of the Yeonan Kim clan, was a posthumous name bestowed to the wife and second queen consort of Yi Yeon, King Seonjo, the 14th Joseon monarch. She was queen consort of Joseon from 1602 until her husband's death in 1608, after which she was honoured as Queen Dowager Soseong (소성왕대비) during the reign of her step-son Yi Hon, King Gwanghae and as Grand Queen Dowager Myeongryeol (명렬대왕대비) during the reign of her step-grandson Yi Jong, King Injo.

Biography

Early life 
The future queen was born on 15 December 1584, Hansongbang, Hanseong, during the reign of King Seonjo. Her father, Kim Je-nam, was member of the Yeonan Kim clan and her mother was member of the Gwangju No clan. Through her father, she a maternal 6th great-granddaughter of Princess Jeongui and a maternal 7th great-granddaughter of Queen Soheon and King Sejong. Through her mother, she is also the maternal 7th great-granddaughter of King Sejong and Queen Soheon through her 6th great-grandfather, Grand Prince Imyeong. Princess Jeongui was the older sister of King Munjong, King Sejo, and Grand Prince Imyeong.

Lady No was also a paternal cousin of Crown Princess Minhoe’s maternal grandmother; making Lady Kim a first cousin twice removed of the princess consort. 

Through her paternal great-grandfather, Lady Kim was a first cousin thrice removed of Kim Ahn-ro and also became the 8th great-grandaunt of Kim Su-deok, Prince Kang’s wife, through her younger brother, Kim Gyu.

Life as queen consort 
Lady Kim was later chosen and arranged to marry King Seonjo, and became Queen Consort in 1602 at age of 19 after King Seonjo’s first Queen consort, Queen Uiin died in 1600. The king himself at the time was 32 years her senior and was older than her parents; her mother being 7 years and her father being 10 years his juniors. This marriage was considered the second oldest marriage with Queen Jeongsun’s and King Yeongjo’s having a 51 year age gap being the first.

After becoming Queen, her father was given the royal title, Internal Prince Yeonheung (연흥부원군, Yeonheung Buwongun), and her mother was given the royal title, Internal Princess Consort Gwangsan (광산부부인, Gwangsan Bubuin).

By the time she was named Queen Consort, her husband had already appointed Prince Gwanghae as his Heir to the throne as Queen Uiin died without issue. Gwanghae was the second son of Seonjo, born to Royal Noble Consort Gong of the Gimhae Kim clan, the King's senior 1st rank concubine. Gwanghae acted as the de facto ruler of the Joseon Dynasty during Japanese invasions of Korea from 1592 until 1598. 

In 1603, the Queen gave birth to Princess Jeongmyeong. She birthed another princess in 1604 but that child died in infancy that same year. In 1606, the Queen gave birth to a son, Yi Ui, later honoured as Grand Prince Yeongchang. According to Gyechuk Ilgi, Gwanghae and his in-laws were greatly agitated because they believe Gwanghae's position as heir to the throne was threatened, because according to the law, the Queen's son had higher rank and better claim in the succession than a concubine's son. Seonjo and a few of his supporters had plans to push his legitimate son as heir, but Gwanghae soon found out and Seonjo was unable to enact this change due to his unexpected death.

Gwanghaegun's reign 
After Seonjo died in 1608, Gwanghae ascended to the throne as the fifteenth king of the Joseon Dynasty and the Queen was honoured as Queen Dowager Soseong. During his reign, Gwanghae persecuted Soseong and Yeongchang relentlessly. Soseong resisted the King's insistent demands that she turn over Yeongchang to him. Eventually, she handed Yeongchang over to Gwanghae so he could be raised and educated in the palace as a Royal Prince. Unfortunately, Yeongchang was exiled to Ganghwa Island along with the Queen Dowager's  father, Kim Je-nam, her brothers and brother-in-law who were all facing investigation. In 1613, the King sentenced Kim Je-Nam, her brothers and her brother-in-law to death.

In 1614, her son, Yeongchang was also sentenced to death.

Soseong herself was deposed and confined to Gyeongun Palace with Princess Jeongmyeong. Her attendants diminished year by year through betrayal, desertion and death.

Later life 
Her confinement ended when Gwanghae was deposed in 1623 and replaced by her step-grandson, Gwanghae's nephew, King Injo. She and her daughter were also granted permission to live within Changdeok Palace with their titles and positions being reinstated; she was later honoured as Grand Queen Dowager Myeongryeol in 1624.

During Kim Injo’s enthronement, her 21 year-old daughter, Princess Jeongmyeong, was considered too old to marry. So the Princess was to quickly be married off to someone who was younger than her rather than them being older or of similar age. There isn’t a explanation as to why the marriage selection of Princess Jeongmyeong was delayed, but it was said that it might have been the fear and worry the Grand Queen Dowager held towards her daughter living outside of the palace during Gwanghaegun’s reign.

Her daughter later married Hong Ju-won in 1623, who was 3 years her junior, and eventually had 7 sons and 1 daughter during their marriage. One of her grandsons became the great-great-grandfather of Lady Hyegyeong; the future wife of her step great-great-great-great-great-grandson, Crown Prince Sado.

The Grand Queen Dowager died during King Injo’s 9th year of reign at the age of 47 on 13 August 1632, and is buried in Mokneung, Guri, Gyeonggi, with her husband and his first queen consort, Queen Uiin. She was posthumously honoured as Queen Inmok.

Prior to her death, Queen Inmok had made and given a note to her family regarding the life of a royal. She stated and pleaded to not have family relatives from her clan to marry within the royal family as she suffered from carrying the burden as one. This note would eventually pass down to her 8th great-grandniece, Kim Su-deok, who would also suffer an unhappy arranged marriage.

Gyechuk Ilgi
Gyechuk Ilgi (Diary of the Year Gyechuk, 1613) was diary supposedly composed by unnamed court lady intimate with and devoted to Queen Inmok and written from Queen Inmok's perspective, though its diary format accords it the appearance of documentary objectivity. In the Yujeomsa Temple on Mountain Geumgang, a part of Bomungyeong written by Queen Inmok remains.

Kim Yongsuk, one of the best informed scholars on premodern Korean women and women writers, after carefully sifting the pertinent historical records, concludes that the picture of Gwanghae given in Gyechuk Ilgi deviates markedly from the account of him in contemporary historical records. Gwanghae, writes Professor Kim, was in fact "a wise and good king." Despite his best efforts, he couldn't save his own elder brother or his half-brother or finally himself from the political factionalism that raged during his reign.

She suggests several reasons for the gross distortions in the diary. First, it was composed after Gwanghae was overthrown. Second, it was probably the work of a court lady loyal to Queen Inmok. Third, following the pattern of extreme opposition between good and evil already established in traditional fiction of the Joseon period, the work distorts, simplifies, and exaggerates more complex situations involving Gwanghae, his brother and half-brother, and Queen Inmok.

Family
Parent

 Father − Kim Je-Nam (1562 – 1 June 1613) (김제남, 金悌男)
 1) Grandfather − Kim Oh (1526 – 1570) (김오, 金祦)
 2) Great-Grandfather − Kim An-do (김안도, 金安道)
 3) Great-Great-Grandfather - Kim Jeon (김전, 金詮) (1458 - 1523)
 4) Great-Great-Great-Grandfather - Kim Woo-shin (김우신, 金友臣)
 4) Great-Great-Great-Grandmother - Lady Lee of the Incheon Lee clan (이천 이씨)
 3) Great-Great-Grandmother - Lady Song of the Jincheon Song clan (진천 송씨)
 2) Great-Grandmother − Lady Kang (강씨, 姜氏)
 1) Grandmother − Lady Gwon of the Andong Gwon clan (본관: 안동 권씨)
 Mother − Internal Princess Consort Gwangsan of the Gwangju No clan (1557 – 1637) (광산부부인 노씨, 光山府夫人  盧氏)
 1) Grandfather − No Ge (1534 – 1569) (노게)
 1) Grandmother − Lady Han of the Cheongju Han clan (본관: 청주 한씨)

Siblings

 Older brother − Kim Nae (김내, 金琜) (1576 - 1 June 1613)
Sister-in-law − Lady Jeong of the Chogye Jeong clan (초계 정씨, 草溪 鄭氏) (1575 - 1640)
 Nephew − Kim Cheon-seok (김천석, 金天錫) (1604 - 1673)
 Nephew - Kim Gu-seok (김군석, 金君錫); became the adoptive son of Kim Seon (김선, 金瑄)
 Niece − Lady Kim of the Yeonan Kim clan
 Nephew-in-law - Kim Gwang-chan (김광찬, 金光燦) (1597 - 24 February 1668)
 Niece − Lady Kim of the Yeonan Kim clan
 Nephew-in-law - Choi Geuk-ryang (최극량)
Niece - Lady Kim of the Yeonan Kim clan
 Nephew-in-law - Yi Hu-yeon (이후연)
 Older sister − Lady Kim of the Yeonan Kim clan (1581 - 1604)
 Brother-in-law − Sim Jeong-se (심정세, 沈挺世) (1579 - 1 June 1613)
 Nephew - Sim Jin (심진, 沈榗) (1602 - 1690)
 Niece - Lady Sim of the Cheongsong Sim clan
 Nephew-in-law - Baek Hong-il (백홍일)
 Younger brother − Kim Gyu (김규, 金珪) (1596 - 1 June 1613)
 Sister-in-law −  Seo Mi-saeng (서미생, 徐楣生), Lady Seo of the Daegu Seo clan (본관: 대구 서씨) (1597 - 1666)
 Nephew − Kim Hong-seok (김홍석, 金弘錫) (1612 - ?)
 Younger brother − Kim Seon (김선, 金瑄) (1599 - 1 June 1613)
 Adoptive nephew − Kim Gun-seok (김군석, 金君錫); son of Kim Nae (김내)

Consort

 Yi Yeon, King Seonjo (26 November 1552 – 16 March 1608) (조선 선조)
 Mother-in-law - Grand Internal Princess Consort Hadong of the Hadong Jeong clan (23 September 1522 – 24 June 1567) (하동부대부인 정씨)
 Legal mother-in-law - Queen Insun of the Cheongsong Sim clan (인순왕후 심씨) (27 June 1532 - 12 February 1575)
 Father-in-law - Yi Cho, Grand Internal Prince Deokheung (2 April 1530 – 14 June 1559) (이초 덕흥대원군)
 Legal father-in-law - Yi Hwan, King Myeongjong (조선 명종) (3 July 1534 - 2 August 1567)

Issue

 Daughter − Princess Jeongmyeong (정명공주) (27 June 1603 – 8 September 1685)
 Son-in-law − Hong Ju-Won (홍주원) (1606 – 1672)
 Grandson − Hong Man-yong (홍만용, 洪萬容) (1631 - 1692)
 Great-Great-Great-Granddaughter − Lady Hyegyeong (1735 - 1816)
 Unnamed daughter (1604); died prematurely
 Son − Yi Ui, Grand Prince Yeongchang (이의 영창대군) (12 April 1606 – 19 March 1614)
 Adoptive grandson − Prince Changseong (창성군 필, 昌城君 佖) (1627 - 1689)

In popular culture

Drama 
 Portrayed by Lee Bo-hee in the 1995 KBS TV series West Palace.
Portrayed by Hong Eun-hee in the 1999-2000 MBC TV series Hur Jun.
Portrayed by Hong Soo-hyun in the 2003-2004 SBS TV series King's Woman.
Portrayed by Choi Soo-ji in the 2008 KBS2 TV series Hong Gil-dong.
 Portrayed by Seo Yi-ahn in the 2013 MBC TV series Hur Jun, The Original Story.
 Portrayed by Ko Won-hee in the 2014 KBS2 TV series The King's Face.
 Portrayed by Shin Eun-jung in the 2015 MBC TV series Splendid Politics.
 Portrayed by Jang Young-nam in the 2019 tvN TV series The Crowned Clown.
 Portrayed by Oh Ha-nee in the 2019 KBS2 TV series The Tale of Nokdu.
 Portrayed by Yoon Young-min in the 2021 MBN TV series Bossam: Steal the Fate.

Webtoon 
 Portrayed in the 2019 KakaoPage Webtoon series Finally, the Blue Flame (마침내 푸른 불꽃이).

References

Notes

17th-century Korean people
1584 births
1632 deaths
Royal consorts of the Joseon dynasty
Korean queens consort